

Eadgar (or Edgar; died between 789 and 793) was a medieval Bishop of London.

Eadgar was consecrated between 787 and 789. He died between 789 and 793.

Citations

References

External links
 

Bishops of London
8th-century deaths
Year of birth unknown
8th-century English bishops